Ken Johnson was an American politician. He was a member of the Alabama House of Representatives 7th District, serving from 2010 to 2018. He is a member of the Republican party.

References

Living people
Republican Party members of the Alabama House of Representatives
21st-century American politicians
Year of birth missing (living people)